Spaghetti a mezzanotte, a.k.a. Spaghetti at Midnight, is a 1981 Italian comedy film directed by Sergio Martino.

Plot 
In 1980s Asti, Italy, a lawyer with a cheating wife and dangerous lover has to deal with a Mafia boss who demands his services with a gunman who tries in vain to hide at his villa.

Cast 
Lino Banfi: Avv. Savino Lagrasta
Barbara Bouchet: Celeste Lagrasta
Alida Chelli: Zelmira Demma
Teo Teocoli: Arch. Andrea Soldani
Pippo Santonastaso: Cesare Picotto, "Cesarino"
Daniele Vargas: Ulderico Demma, the judge 
Ugo Bologna: Don Vito Malisperi
Jacques Stany: Saruzzo

References

External links 
 

1981 films
1980s Italian-language films
Films directed by Sergio Martino
Films scored by Detto Mariano
1980s sex comedy films
Commedia sexy all'italiana
Films set in Piedmont
1981 comedy films
1980s Italian films